The 2011 Nordic Opening was the 2nd edition of the Nordic Opening, an annual cross-country skiing event. The three-day event was the second competition round of the 2011–12 FIS Cross-Country World Cup, after Sjusjøen, Norway.

World Cup points distribution 
The winners of the overall standings were awarded 200 World Cup points and the winners of each of the three stages were awarded 50 World Cup points.

A total of 350 points was possible to achieve if one athlete won all three stages and the overall standings.

Overall standings

Overall leadership by stage

References 

2011–12 FIS Cross-Country World Cup
2011
2011 in cross-country skiing
November 2011 sports events in Europe